Paul Hiles (born 13 November 1948) is a Bermudian sailor. He competed in the Finn event at the 1972 Summer Olympics.

References

External links
 

1948 births
Living people
Bermudian male sailors (sport)
Olympic sailors of Bermuda
Sailors at the 1972 Summer Olympics – Finn
Place of birth missing (living people)